Justin Harrison, born 20 April 1974 in Sydney, is a former Australian international rugby union player, who played lock forward and is currently the head of the Australian Rugby Union Players Association (RUPA)

Career
Discovered in 1993 by GoldRats Rugby Union Club of Southern Cross University, Lismore, New South Wales while studying coastal and fisheries management, he then moved onto the Tuggeranong Vikings Rugby Union Club in Canberra, he made the 1994 Australian Capital Territory (ACT) Under-21s and then the Australian Universities team. The following year, he played in the Australian U21s team and made his debut for the ACT against New South Wales B. He made his Super 12 debut with the Brumbies in 1997.

He made his international début as Australia took on the British and Irish Lions in the third and final test of the 2001 series; at the time Harrison was a student studying for a Bachelor of Applied Science in Sports Administration at the University of Canberra from which he graduated in 2001.

A veteran of the 2003 Rugby World Cup, Harrison joined the New South Wales Waratahs at the beginning of 2004 for two seasons before moving to the northern hemisphere to play for Ulster.

As of 23 May 2006, Harrison had played 25 games for Ulster, 19 of those in the Celtic League and 6 in the Heineken Cup. Harrison proved an effective player in the Celtic League, a consistent winner of line-out possession and aggressive in rucks and mauls. Although regarded as inspiring by other Ulster players, his tendency to indulge in sledging led to confrontation with a number of opposing players and a number of off the pitch incidents.

At the end of the 2008 season, Harrison moved to Bath Rugby. until his retirement after involvement with the cocaine scandal and a bar fight with Harlequins players at Bath at the end of the 2008/09 season.

On Monday 30 November 2009, it was announced that Justin Harrison would return to play for the Brumbies in 2010 on a one-year deal, as coverage for Peter Kimlin. However, the ARU has not endorsed this contract.

In July 2010 it was announced that Harrison would become forwards coach at Brumbies, agreeing a two-year deal with the club.

References

External links
Bath profile
Ulster profile
Rugby Heroes page 1
Rugby Heroes page 2
Brumbies

Living people
University of Canberra alumni
Australian rugby union players
Australian rugby union coaches
Australia international rugby union players
ACT Brumbies players
New South Wales Waratahs players
Ulster Rugby players
Bath Rugby players
Barbarian F.C. players
Rugby union locks
1974 births
Doping cases in rugby union
Southern Cross University alumni
Rugby union players from Sydney